Bhandardara is a holiday resort village near Igatpuri, in the western ghats of India.

Bhandardara sits by the Pravara River, and the natural environment, waterfalls, mountains, Wilson dam, Arthur lake and Randha falls are tourist attractions.

Bhandardara attractions include Wilson Dam and Arthur Lake. The recent attraction in this place is Fireflies camp in the Purushwadi area.

There are number of historic and natural places of interest near the dam. From Bhandardara, visitors can climb up to see the Ratangad and Harishchandragad forts. Or visitors can follow the trails that lead to Ajoba and Ghanchakkar peaks. The highest peak in Maharashtra, Mount Kalsubai is 1646 m, and the starting point for this trek is Bari Village, located 12 km away from Bhandardara. Atop, there is a small temple located at the summit, with views of Sahyadris and Bhandardara. The toughest trio-forts in Sahyadri namely Alang Fort, Madangad fort and Kulang gad (also called A-M-K) located on the southern side. A very narrow Sandhan valley is on the Western side of the dam.

Places of interest 
Bhandardara is home to Mount Kalsubai, the highest peak in Maharashtra.

Another tourist attraction is the Wilson Dam on the Pravara River, which was built in 1910. The Umbrella Falls also draw visitors, although it can be seen only during the monsoons between July and October.  About 10 km away from Shendi Village is the Randhaa Waterfalls.  The Ratangad fort is around 22 km from Shendi/ Bhandardara, and is connected by both roadway, and ferry across the Lake Arthur.  On the Kalsubai side, at the far end of a 22 km roadway across forests and tribal villages, is Konkankada from where there are views of the plains. Harishchandragad is another nearby mountain hiking spot with ancient temples on top.

Bhandardara has a number of treking and hiking routes, including a small trek to Ratangad fort, which is reached by boat over a small lake near the village Ratanwadi.

Ratanwadi is known for its boat rides. Ratangad is a fortress situated at the edge of ghats with a number of water cisterns and caves. It also commands views all around and is said to be the favourite fort of the Maratha king, Shivaji.

Attractions 

 Ratangad (Fort)
 Agasti Rishi Ashram
 Amruteshwar Temple
 Sandhan Valley
Randha Fall
Necklace Fall
Harishandragad (Fort)
Kokankada (Ghatghar)
Reverse Fall
Nhani Fall
Umbrella Fall
Fire Flies
Nilwande Dam

Other attractions

Wilson Dam: Built in 1910 across River Pravara, Wilson Dam is situated at a height of 150 m above sea level. It's one of the oldest dams in the country. The opening of sluice gates creates two 60 to 80 feet cascades of water that plummet to the rocks below. 

Arthur Lake: The clear and placid lake is bounded by thick canopied forests of the Sahyadri hills. The Lake gets its water from the Pravara River. A narrow road encircles the lake forming a roughly 50 km loop the gives access to views, campsites and hiking trails in the hills surrounding the lake.

Randha Falls: At Randha Falls, the River Pravara descends down from a height of 170 ft into a gorge. However the waterfalls are best viewed during monsoons and are not so great in other seasons.

Ghatghar: Located 22 km from Bhandardara, Ghatghar is a viewpoint in the area. It offers views of the Sahyadri ranges.

Mount Kalsubai: from Bhandardara, the highest peak of the Sahyadri range, Mount Kalsubai, can be seen. Kalsubai with its height and view is popular for trekking and so are the hills near Kalsubai. Reaching it requires a physically demanding trek, as Bhandardara is on a hill.

Ratnagad : Ratnagad fort was captured by Shivaji. The fort lies near the Maharashtra tourism resort and has ample of grounds to interest trekkers. The fort commands views of the surrounding areas.

Sandhan Valley Located 25 km from Bhandardara, behind Samrad village. There is also reversing water falls nearby but it's active during monsoon only.

Angling:This is popular place for angling. Tourists can spot a number of large fish over here. Tourists can go angling, but boats are not allowed.

Location

State: Maharashtra
Taluka: Akole

Exact Location: A holiday resort village Bhandardara is located on the western coast in Ahmednagar.

Nearest Town: Akole.

Distance from Akole: 45 km.

Transportation

Bhandardara is easily accessible by road also from Mumbai which is around 185 km far and Pune which is around 191 km far. Please be careful with the narrow roads while driving on the ghats towards bhandardara.

The nearest airport is in Nashik around 90 km, while Igatpuri Railway Station, 45+ km away, has the nearest railhead. One can board a state transport bus from Igatpuri to reach Bhandardara.
Regular buses are available from both the cities to reach Bhandardara, or you can also hire a taxi to reach the destination.

References

External links 

 
 MTDC, Bhandardara
Bhandardara

 Bhandardara City Guide

Tourist attractions in Ahmednagar district
Cities and towns in Ahmednagar district
Hill stations in Maharashtra